"I Will Die for You" is a song by Swiss singer-songwriter Luca Hänni. It was written and produced by Dieter Bohlen for from his debut studio album My Name Is Luca (2012). The song was released as the album's second single on 24 August 2012 by Universal Music and peaked at number 37 on the Swiss Singles Chart.

Music video
A music video to accompany the release of "I Will Die for You" was first released onto YouTube on 1 October 2013 at a total length of three minutes and twenty-nine seconds.

Track listing

Charts

Release history

References

2012 singles
2012 songs
Luca Hänni songs
Songs written by Dieter Bohlen